is a former Japanese football player.

Playing career
Nagahashi was born in Fuji on August 2, 1975. After graduating from high school, he joined his local club Shimizu S-Pulse in 1994. He debuted and played many matches as right side midfielder in 1995. However he could not play at all in the match in 1996. In 1997, he moved to Japan Football League club Kawasaki Frontale. He became a regular player as right side midfielder. The club was promoted to J2 League in 1999 and J1 League in 2000. In 2000, the club won the 2nd place J.League Cup. However the club was relegated to J2 from 2001. In 2004, the club won the champions and was promoted to J1 from 2005. In 2006, he could hardly play in the match and retired end of 2006 season.

Club statistics

References

External links

orions.ne.jp

1975 births
Living people
Association football people from Shizuoka Prefecture
Japanese footballers
J1 League players
J2 League players
Japan Football League (1992–1998) players
Shimizu S-Pulse players
Kawasaki Frontale players
Association football midfielders